Mainstream rock (also known as heritage rock) is a radio format used by many commercial radio stations in the United States and Canada.

Format background
Mainstream rock stations represent the middle ground between classic rock and active rock on the programming spectrum, in that they play more classic rock songs from the 1970s and 1980s and fewer songs from emerging acts than active rock stations, and only rarely play songs on the softer edge of the classic rock format. They program a balanced airplay of tracks found on active rock and classic rock playlists, but the music playlist tends to focus on charting hard rock music from the 1970s through the 2000s.

Mainstream rock is the true successor to the widespread album-oriented rock (AOR) format created in the 1970s. However, mainstream rock can be used as a modernized update of classic rock if any radio station playlist has to cut back on some active rock artists and songs due to ratings and popularity demand, which is an absolute variable in each local market by each state and each franchised or locally owned radio company operation. To this day, there are a select few mainstream rock programmed stations that will purposely play any new rock artist while keeping the classics involved, which sits on a borderline scale being influenced by active rock strongly. Meanwhile, some stations consist of playing all 40 years worth of rock hits, ranging from classic hard rock and hair metal artists all the way to 2000s hard rock and metal artists, the format is an open variable. Acts that receive heavy airplay on classic rock stations, including The Beatles, Elton John, Fleetwood Mac, Eagles, or Supertramp receive some airplay on mainstream rock stations, albeit less frequently than acts like Green Day, Nirvana, Pearl Jam, Foo Fighters, Red Hot Chili Peppers, or Alice in Chains. Classic rock of the late 1960s to the late 1980s with the addition of 1990s alternative and grunge is the typical expectation for mainstream rock, it is less common to hear many newer rock artists.

Mainstream rock has evolved into a sequel for the classic rock radio format. It has begun to remove artists that are post 1990s, following a trend as classic rock stations rarely play harder songs and artists within their format.

Outside the United States and Canada, mainstream rock refers generally to rock music deemed "radio friendly". It very rarely is referred to as a specific radio format.

See also
Active rock - like mainstream rock, but plays a very popular demand of new and emerging hard rock and heavy metal artists along with the classics, but can also adopt some Alternative Rock songs as well
Classic rock - contributes to classic songs from the age of rock that started
Alternative rock - contributes to new alternative rock format, but primarily based on new and emerging alternative rock artists, some Indie alternative artists, some 90's alternative and Grunge and some Emo- Alternative and pop punk

Rock radio formats
Radio formats